Rhus microphylla, the littleleaf sumac, desert sumac, correosa, or agritos, is a species of sumac in the family Anacardiaceae, native to North America, in the southwestern United States and northern and central Mexico, from central and western Texas, southern New Mexico, central and northern regions of the Mexican Altiplano-(Mexican Plateau), and extreme southeastern Arizona of the Madrean Sky Islands.

References

External links

Lady Bird Johnson database, w/ gallery
CalPhotos gallery
Interactive Distribution Map of Rhus microphylla

microphylla
North American desert flora
Flora of Northeastern Mexico
Flora of the Chihuahuan Desert
Trees of Mexico
Trees of the Southwestern United States
Trees of the South-Central United States
Flora of the Mexican Plateau
Flora without expected TNC conservation status